Costică Brădățan is a Romanian-born American philosopher. He is a Professor of Humanities in the Honors College at Texas Tech University. Also he is an Honorary Research Professor of Philosophy at University of Queensland.

Books
 The Other Bishop Berkeley. An Exercise in Reenchantment (Fordham University Press, 2007) 
 Dying for Ideas: the Dangerous Lives of the Philosophers (Bloomsbury, 2015)
 In Praise of Failure. Four Lessons in Humility (Harvard University Press, 2022) 
 Against Conformity. Reinventing the Lost Art of Cynicism (under development)
 The Prince and the Hermit (under development).

References

External links
 Costica Bradatan

21st-century American philosophers
Philosophy academics
Year of birth missing (living people)
Texas Tech University faculty
Continental philosophers
Academic staff of the University of Queensland
Living people